Amor de Perdição is a 19th-century Portuguese novel by Camilo Castelo Branco. It has been adapted into several films, like Amor de Perdição (1979 film) and a telenovela.

Adaptations
Its most recent adaptation is the 2009 film Doomed Love, directed by Mario Barroso.

 
1862 novels
19th-century Portuguese novels
Portuguese novels adapted into films
Novels by Camilo Castelo Branco
Portuguese-language novels